This is a list of golf courses in Iceland.

Courses by Region

Capital Region
Álftaness Golf Club
Brautarholts Golf Club
Keilir Golf Club
Kópavogs/Garðabæjar Golf Club
Mosfellsbæjar Golf Club
Oddur Golf Club
Reykjavik Golf Club
Setberg Golf Club
Nesklúbburinn Golf Club

Southern Peninsula
Grindavíkur Golf Club
Suðurnesja Golf Club
Sandgerðis Golf Club
Vatnsleysustrandar Golf Club

Western Region
Borgarness Golf Club
Glanni Golf Club
Húsafelli Golf Club
Jökull Golf Club
Leynir Golf Club
Mostri Golf Club
Skrifla Golf Club
Staðarsveitar Golf Club
Vestarr Golf Club

Westfjords
Bíldudals Golf Club
Bolungarvíkur Golf Club
Gláma Golf Club
Hólmavíkur Golf Club
Ísafjarðar Golf Club
Patreksfjarðar Golf Club

Northwestern Region
Siglufjarðar Golf Club
Ós Golf Club
Skagastrandar Golf Club
Sauðárkróks Golf Club

Northeastern Region
Akureyri Golf Club
Fjallabyggðar Golf Club
Húsavíkur Golf Club
Hamar Golf Club
Hvammur Grenivík Golf Club
Mývatnssveitar Golf Club
Lundur Golf Club
Gljúfri Golf Club
Vopnafjarðar Golf Club

Eastern Region
Byggðarholts Golf Club
Fljótsdalshéraðs Golf Club
Hornafjarðar Golf Club
Fjarðarbyggðar Golf Club
Norðfjarðar Golf Club
Seyðisfjarðar Golf Club

Southern Region
Ásatúns Golf Club
Dalbúi Golf Club
Geysir Golf Club
Flúðir Golf Club
Hveragerðis Golf Club
Hellu Golf Club
Kiðjaberg Golf Club
Vík Golf Club
Selfoss Golf Club
Tuddi Golf Club
Úthlíð Golf Club
Westman Islands Golf Club
Þorlákshafnar Golf Club
Þverá Hellishólum Golf Club
Öndverðarness Golf Club

References

External links

Icelandic Golf Association: List of Clubs
Leading Courses: List of golf clubs in Iceland 

 
Iceland, courses
Golf courses